This is a list of artists who perform within the Christian hip hop subgenre, a subgenre of both hip hop music and contemporary Christian music, containing Christian lyrics.

Artists

0–9
 116 Clique
 4th Avenue Jones
 6 Way St.

A
 Alert312
 The Ambassador
 Applejaxx

B
 B-U
 Basehead
 B. Cooper
 B. Reith
 BB Jay
 Beautiful Eulogy
 Benjah
 Bizzle
 Braille (formerly known as Bryan Winchester)
 Brainwash Projects
 Brethren
 Timothy Brindle
 Brinson
 Bryson Gray
 Bumps Inf
 Bushwick Bill

C
 Canon
 Capital Kings
 Byron "Mr. Talkbox" Chambers
 Chance the Rapper
 Cheno Lyfe
 Chris Cobbins
 Aaron Cole
 The Cross Movement

D
 D-Boy
 D-Maub
 D-Naff
 Da' T.R.U.T.H.
 Datin
 DC Talk
 Dee-1
 Deepspace5
 Deezer D
 Deraj
 Derek Minor (formerly known as Pro)
 D.O.C.
 DJ Dust
 DJ Maj
 DJ Official
 Dre Murray
 Dwayne Tryumf
 Dynamic Twins

E
 Emcee N.I.C.E.
 End Time Warriors (also known as E.T.W.)
 Eshon Burgundy
 Everyday Process

F
 Alex Faith
 Faith Child
 Family Force 5
 Fern
 FLAME
 Foreknown
 Stan Fortuna
 Kirk Franklin
 Fresh I.E.

G
 Gawvi
 Aha Gazelle
 Gemstones
 Jon Gibson
 Jamie Grace
 GRITS
 God's Property
 Gospel Gangstaz
 Gowe
 Christon Gray
 Taelor Gray
 Group 1 Crew
 Guvna B

H
 Half Mile Home
 MC Hammer
 Hazakim
 HeeSun Lee
 Jackie Hill-Perry
 HillaryJane
 Hollyn
 Hostyle Gospel

I
 Ill Harmonics

J
 J.R.
 Jai
 Japhia Life
 JGivens
 Je'kob
 MC Jin
 Joey the Jerk
 John Givez
 Sean C. Johnson
 Brent Jones
 Canton Jones
 Chad Jones
 Mahogany Jones
 Json
 JTM

K
 K-Drama
 K. Sparks
 Kanye West
 KB
 Kendrick Lamar
 KJ-52
 Krum (formerly Playdough)

L
 L.E.D?
 LA Symphony
 Lecrae
 Shai Linne
 Liquid
 Listener 
 LPG
 LZ7

M
 Mali Music
 Manafest
 Manchild
 Mars Ill
 Marty
 Mase
 Heath McNease
 Cody Miles
 Andy Mineo (formerly known as C-Lite)
 Willie "Pdub" Moore Jr.
 George Moss
 Mr. Del
 Mr. J. Medeiros

N
 Antonio Neal
 New Breed
 NF
 No Malice (formerly known as Malice)

O
 Only Won

P
 Corey Paul
 Peabod
 Peace 586 (formerly known as MC Peace)
 Michael Peace
 Pettidee
 Phanatik
 Pigeon John

 P.O.D.
 Promise
 Propaganda
 Purified

Q
 Quest

R
 R.M.G.
 R-Swift
 Rapture Ruckus
 Rawsrvnt
 Reconcile
 RedCloud
 Redimi2
 John Reuben
 Dax Reynosa
 Rev. Run
 Rhema Soul
 Ruudolf
 .rod laver

S
 Sev Statik
 Sevin
 Sintax the Terrific
 S.O.
 Sho Baraka
 Shonlock
 Sivion
 Skrip
 Sean Slaughter
 Dan Smith (formerly known as Listener)
 Social Club Misfits (formerly known as Social Club)
 Soul-Junk
 SoulJa
 Soup the Chemist
 Stephen the Levite
 Street Symphony
 Swoope
 Symbolic One (also known as S1)

T
 T-Bone
 Tedashii
 thebandwithnoname
 Theory Hazit
 Thi'sl
 tobyMac
 Tony Tillman
 Trip Lee
 Tunnel Rats
 Tyshane

U
 Uncle Reece

V
 V. Rose
 Verbs (formerly known as Knowdaverbs)
 Vico C
 Viktory

W
 Wande
 Kanye West
 W.L.A.K. (acronym for We Live As Kings)
 The Washington Projects
 Whosoever South
 Stephen Wiley
 iROCC Williams
 Paul Wright

Y
 Yo Majesty
 Young Chozen
 Young Joshua

Z
 Zane One
 Asaiah Ziv

See also
 List of Christian bands and artists by genre

References 

 
 
Lists of hip hop musicians